The Bangor City Forest also known as the Rolland F. Perry City Forest is a large recreation area in Bangor, Maine. The trail system is well maintained and most trails are packed gravel. Although primarily a recreational area, it is technically a "working forest."

The park has a large parking and picnic area located at the end of Tripp Drive.  Additional parking is available at the end of Kittredge Road. 

The boardwalk is handicapped accessible.

External links
 Orono Bog Boardwalk
 Bangor City Forest Report

Bangor, Maine
Protected areas of Penobscot County, Maine
Tourist attractions in Bangor, Maine